Artyukhovka is a rural locality (a village) in Aydaralinsky Selsoviet, Sterlibashevsky District, Bashkortostan, Russia. The population was 52 as of 2010. There is 1 street.

Geography 
Artyukhovka is located 18 km southwest of Sterlibashevo (the district's administrative centre) by road. Aydarali is the nearest rural locality.

References 

Rural localities in Sterlibashevsky District